Haplolepis is an extinct genus of prehistoric ray-finned fish that lived during the late Moscovian stage of the Pennsylvanian epoch.

See also

 Prehistoric fish
 List of prehistoric bony fish

References

Palaeonisciformes
Pennsylvanian fish
Prehistoric ray-finned fish genera